ViS Research was an American company that transformed clinical trial planning with a pioneer site feasibility platform. The ViS online platform provided tools and analytics to pharmaceutical and biotechnology companies and contract research organizations that transformed how locations, research centers and investigators are evaluated for inclusion in clinical trials.

ViS was acquired by IQVIA (formerly known as IMS Health - Quintiles) in June 2015.

References

External links 
 Valor Economico article
 AAHRPP and ViS Research Collaborate to Protect Research Participants, Advance Quality Research
 Trial Site Feasibility Platform Looks to End Onerous Paper Questionnaires
Pharmaceutical companies of the United States
Health care companies based in New York (state)
2010 establishments in New York City
Pharmaceutical companies established in 2010